Marybai Huking (born November 11, 1996) is an American goalball player who won a bronze medal at the 2016 Summer Paralympics. She was adopted from China when she was two years old, and raised in Salt Lake City.

She was born with albinism and classified as legally blind.

References

External links
 
 

1996 births
Living people
Female goalball players
Paralympic goalball players of the United States
Paralympic bronze medalists for the United States
Paralympic medalists in goalball
Goalball players at the 2016 Summer Paralympics
Medalists at the 2016 Summer Paralympics
Medalists at the 2015 Parapan American Games
Medalists at the 2019 Parapan American Games
University of Utah alumni
Sportspeople from Salt Lake City
Sportspeople from Jiangxi
People from Yingtan
American adoptees
Chinese adoptees
American sportspeople of Chinese descent
Chinese emigrants to the United States
Chinese blind people
People with albinism
Portland State University alumni
Goalball players at the 2020 Summer Paralympics